"If You're Not the One" is a song by New Zealand-British singer Daniel Bedingfield. It was released on 25 November 2002 as the third single from his debut studio album, Gotta Get Thru This (2002). The single entered the top 20 on the majority of charts that it appeared on, including becoming a number-one hit on the UK Singles Chart and reaching number 15 on the US Billboard Hot 100.

Background and writing
"If You're Not the One" is written as a love ballad. Daniel Bedingfield claims to have been inspired by the band Westlife, when writing and recording the song. Bedingfield himself believes that the song is "cheesy." Bedingfield admitted he began writing the song because he realized that material he considered more "complex", was unlikely to get him a record deal. "Commercialism, sappy lyrics and meek tunes are the things I hate most in the universe, but I'm not sure even Bob Dylan could get record company interest without hooks these days", Bedingfield recalled in an interview with The Daily Telegraph. "It's a different age. You need to go some kind of populist route. So, about three years ago, I sat down with a Westlife song and tried to write something similar."

Bedingfield also admitted that he didn't even want to put the song on his album. He said, "I didn't want to put "If You're Not the One" on the album as I thought it was too cheesy. I thought it sounded like Westlife. But she (Natasha Bedingfield, his sister) loved it. Women that hear it go all soft and think it's lovely"

Composition
"If You're Not the One" plays for 4 minutes and 19 seconds, in common time. It is in the key of B-flat major, and the chorus features Bedingfield singing falsetto, where he hits the note E♭5.

Critical reception
"If You're Not the One" received mixed reviews from contemporary music critics. On the positive side, Peter Robinson, in the Gotta Get Thru This album review for the New Musical Express (NME), wrote "If You're Not the One [recalls] every chart-mauling uber-ballad you've ever heard". Nedd Raggett of AllMusic commented in his album review "When it comes to ballads, they work best in sudden moments – the soaring end to If You're Not the One". About.com ranked the song at number 27 on its list of the 'Top 100 Pop Songs of 2002', two places behind the album's title track. The song was again ranked at number 27 on the 2003 list, due to it being released in the United States during that year. Music Week felt that the song showed Bedingfield's "sensitive side", and that the song "showcases his vocal range to stunning effect." The magazine even considered it "beautifully crafted."

However, the track also received some negative feedback. PopMatters Nikki Tranter wrote "surely you would think with his obviously overwhelming ability to compose utter claptrap cleverly disguised as serious prophesizing, his lyrics might contain something a little more expressive than 'If you're not the one / Why does my heart feel glad today / If you're not the one / Then why does my hand fit yours this way.'" In his review for musicOMH, Michael Hubbard was even less positive, stating, "If You're Not the One is as vomit-inducing as anything the man in the plastic mask has ever wretched (sic) forth at the world".

Chart performance
When the song was released as a single, it was picked up by radio stations. It was the most added pop song on the radio for the week of 20 February 2003. In the US, the song was the most added song in the Adult Contemporary market for the week of 7 April 2003. In the US, the song was his highest debuting single, debuting at number 55 on the Billboard Hot 100. The single proved to be a successful release for Bedingfield, providing him with several worldwide number ones and reaching the top 20 in all but one of the charts that it appeared on. It debuted at number one in the UK Singles Chart, knocking Christina Aguilera's "Dirrty" from the top spot.

Music video
The music video was produced by A1 singer Mark Read. It begins with a series of images of Bedingfield singing in various positions against a black backdrop. When the chorus starts he is seen singing with clouds in the background. The initial sequence is repeated for the second verse. However, half-way through, he starts to write on a wall. The rest of the song follows the same pattern.

For the US market, a separate video was made. This version features Bedingfield singing the song while drunk one night after a house party, trying to remember who "the one" is. Several of his and the woman's scenes are shown in split-screen format, and exactly match one another. In the end, it is morning, and she returns to him.

Track listings

UK CD single and Australian CD1
 "If You're Not the One" – 4:16
 "James Dean (I Wanna Know)" (acoustic version) – 2:56
 "If You're Not the One" (Metro Mix) – 6:37
 "If You're Not the One" (video) – 4:16

UK cassette single and European CD single
 "If You're Not the One" – 4:16
 "If You're Not the One" (Metro Mix) – 6:37

US CD single
 "If You're Not the One" (radio edit)
 "If You're Not the One" (Metro edit)
 "Album Snippets Medley"

US 12-inch single
A1. "If You're Not the One" (The Passengerz Girlfriend club mix) – 7:09
A2. "If You're Not the One" (Metro Remix) – 6:35
B1. "If You're Not the One" (The Passengerz Girlfriend dub) – 5:55
B2. "If You're Not the One" (Seth Lawrence Future dub) – 6:26

Australian CD2
 "If You're Not the One" (radio edit)
 "If You're Not the One" (Metro Mix edit)
 "James Dean (I Wanna Know)" (ATFC's Committed vocal) – 2:56
 "Gotta Get Thru This" (video)
 "If You're Not the One" (Metro Mix video)

Credits and personnel
Credits are lifted from the Gotta Get Thru This album booklet.

Studios
 Recorded and mixed at Metrophonic Studios (London, England)
 Strings recorded at Angel Recording Studios (London, England)
 Mastered at Sony Music Studios (London, England)

Personnel

 Daniel Bedingfield – writing, additional production
 Adam Philips – guitar
 Danny Cummings – drums
 Gavyn Wright – concertmaster
 Robin Smith – string arrangement, conducting
 Mark Taylor – string arrangement, production, recording, mixing
 Isobel Griffiths – orchestral contracting
 Christian Saint Val – recording and mixing assistant
 Jong Uk Yoon – recording and mixing assistant
 Steve Pryce – engineering
 Mat Bartram – engineering assistant
 John Davis – mastering

Charts

Weekly charts

Year-end charts

Decade-end charts

Certifications

Release history

References

2002 singles
2002 songs
Daniel Bedingfield songs
Island Records singles
Number-one singles in Denmark
Polydor Records singles
Song recordings produced by Mark Taylor (record producer)
Songs about loneliness
Songs written by Daniel Bedingfield
Torch songs
UK Singles Chart number-one singles